Hasan Reza Rural District is a rural district (dehestan) in the Central District of Juybar County, Mazandaran Province, Iran. At the 2006 census, its population was 8,292, in 2,167 families. The rural district has 17 villages.

References 

Rural Districts of Mazandaran Province
Juybar County